Giotto Giuseppe Morandi (born 4 March 1999) is a Swiss professional footballer who plays as a midfielder for Grasshopper in the Swiss Super League.

Professional career
Morandi is a youth product of Ascona, Bellinzona, Lugano and Grasshopper. He made his professional debut for Grasshopper in a 4-0 Swiss Super League loss to FC Basel on 3 February 2019. He signed on loan with Schaffhausen in the second half of the 2019–20 season. He renewed his contract with Grasshopper on 12 February 2020.

In February 2021, he suffered an injury to his cruciate ligament and was out of action for the remainder of the season. In October 2021, he returned to the squad and by March 2022, he played his first minutes back in the Super League. On 2 April 2022, he was in the starting lineup in the derby against FC Zürich, where he also shot the only goal for Grasshoppers in the 1-1 draw, his first ever in the highest Swiss league. He quickly established himself as a mainstay in the first team's lineup for the remainder of the season. On 17 June 2022, he renewed his contract at Grasshoppers until summer 2025 before the start of the new season.

Personal life
Morandi's father, Davide, is a former footballer and coach in Switzerland. Morandi promised him his jersey after shooting his first Super League goal.

References

External links
 
 SFL Profile
 GCZ Profile

1999 births
Living people
People from Locarno
Swiss men's footballers
Switzerland youth international footballers
Swiss people of Italian descent
Grasshopper Club Zürich players
FC Schaffhausen players
Swiss Super League players
Swiss Challenge League players
Association football midfielders
Sportspeople from Ticino